Miro Žeravica (born 18 April 1972) is a retired Croatian swimmer.

Žeravica was born in Split, where he started his swimming career. He later moved to Zagreb.

His greatest success was winning the 1999 European short course gold in 50 m backstroke, ahead of his compatriot Tomislav Karlo.

, Žeravica is head coach of Galatasaray SK swimming in Istanbul.

Sources
Žeravica još uvijek nije svjestan da je europski prvak  
Najljepša nagrada za duge godine treninga i odricanja 
Proglašeni naj sportaši Siska u 2008. godini 

1972 births
Living people
Croatian male swimmers
Croatian male freestyle swimmers
Male butterfly swimmers
Male backstroke swimmers
Croatian swimming coaches
Sportspeople from Split, Croatia
20th-century Croatian people